Virginia's 91st House of Delegates district elects one of the 100 members of the Virginia House of Delegates, the lower house of the state's bicameral legislature. Located in southern, coastal Virginia, the district is made up of the city of Poquoson, part of the city of Hampton and part of York County.

The 91st delegate seat has been held by Republican A.C. Cordoza since 2022.

Electoral history

2019
In the November 2019 election, Democrat Martha Mugler won the open seat, following Gordon Helsel’s retirement.

2021
In the 2021 November General election Republican A. C. Cordoza narrowly defeated incumbent Democrat Martha M. Mugler. A recount is possible after results are certified 2 November.

District officeholders

References

Virginia House of Delegates districts
Hampton, Virginia
Poquoson, Virginia
York County, Virginia